Hossam Al-Harthi  (born June 24, 1992) is a Saudi football player who plays for Kumait as a midfielder. He played in the Pro League for Al-Hilal.

References

1992 births
Living people
Saudi Arabian footballers
Al Hilal SFC players
Al-Raed FC players
Al-Riyadh SC players
Al-Orobah FC players
Al-Qaisumah FC players
Najd FC players
Kumait FC players
Al-Sadd FC (Saudi football club) players
Place of birth missing (living people)
Saudi First Division League players
Saudi Professional League players
Saudi Second Division players
Saudi Fourth Division players
Saudi Third Division players
Association football midfielders